100 Women is a BBC multi-format series established in 2013. The annual series examines the role of women in the 21st century and has included events in London and Mexico. Announcement of the list is the start of an international "BBC's women season", lasting three weeks including broadcast, online reports, debates and journalism on the topic of women. Women around the world are encouraged to participate via Twitter and comment on the list, as well as on the interviews and debates that follow release of the list.

History
After the 2012 Delhi gang rape, then BBC Controller Liliane Landor, BBC editor Fiona Crack and other journalists, were inspired to create a series focusing on the issues and achievements of women in society today. They felt that many of the issues women faced were not getting in-depth coverage, and in March 2013 a "flood of feedback from female listeners" was received by the BBC to the effect that the corporation should provide more "content from and about women."

The BBC launched this series in 2013 to address the under-representation of women in the media. Women to participate in the first program were chosen by survey in 26 different language services. Programming ran over the course of a month, culminating in a conference held on 25 October, in which 100 women from across the world discussed issues they shared. A wide range of topics were debated covering employment challenges, feminism, motherhood, and religion, to examine both the cultural and social challenges women faced in living their lives.

The series has since covered many topics, including education, healthcare, equal pay, genital mutilation, domestic violence, and sexual abuse and seeks to provide women with a platform to discuss how to improve the world and eliminate sexism. Women included on the list are from around the globe, and involved in diverse fields of endeavour. Women who are already famous are included, as well as people who are less known.

Laureates

2022
The list for 2022 was released on 6 December. Women included this year were Olena Zelenska of Ukraine, Nana Darkoa Sekyiamah, the singer Billie Eilish, Priyanka Chopra Jonas, Selma Blair, Lina Abu Akleh, Alla Pugacheva, Elnaz Rekabi and Yulimar Rojas.

2021
The 2021 list was published on 7 December with special focus on Afghanistan. The year's keyword is reset, covering women who have contributed to "playing their part to reinvent our society, our culture and our world". Not everyone's real name was used for their safety; pseudonymised laureates are marked in the table below with an asterisk.

2020
The 2020 list was described as "different" before it was scheduled to be announced on 24 November 2020, but it was released the day before.

2019
The 2019 list was announced on 16 October 2019. The list of candidates was chosen from those nominated by the BBC's different language teams using the 2020 theme which was "The Female Future".

2018 
The 2018 list was announced in November 2018. The list included the 27th Australian Prime Minister Julia Gillard, Stacey Cunningham who runs the New York Stock Exchange and Shaparak Shajarizadeh who challenged the Iranian law that requires women to wear the Hijab.

2017 
In 2017 the women on the list will be part of the 100 Women Challenge, tackling some of the biggest problems facing women around the world. Coming together in four teams, the women will share their experiences and create innovative ways to tackle:
 The glass ceiling (#Teamlead)
 Female illiteracy (#Teamread)
 Street harassment (#Teamgo)
 Sexism in sport (#Teamplay)

Glass ceiling team

Women illiteracy team

Street harassment team

Sexism in sport team

2016 
The 2016 theme was Defiance. Part of the 100 Women festival took place in Mexico City on this year. The main event took place at the Palacio de Bellas Artes, where artists like Julieta Venegas, Ángela Aguilar, Ali Gua Gua, Elis Paprika, Sofía Niño de Rivera, Ximena Sariñana, and Alexis De Anda performed live. The event also features debates with journalists Carmen Aristegui, and Denise Dresser, among others. The 2016 list was published in alphabetical order.

2015
The BBC News 100 Women list in 2015 was made up of many notable international names, as well as women who were unknown, but who represented issues women face.  The women of 2015, were from 51 countries and were not necessarily those who would traditionally have been seen as role models—a woman suffering from depression, a woman who advocates for equal access to bathroom facilities, a woman who encourages other women to avoid make-up, and a reindeer nomad.

2014 

The BBC News 100 Women list in 2014 continued the efforts of the first year's initiative.

2013 

The 2013 event was a month-long BBC series that took place in October. The series examined the role of women in the 21st century and culminated in an event held at BBC Broadcasting House in London, United Kingdom on 25 October 2013 involving a hundred women from around the world, all of whom came from different walks of life. The day featured debate and discussion on radio, television and online, in which the participants were asked to give their opinions about the issues facing women.

The event held on 25 October 2013 featured 100 women from all walks of life.

Other participants

See also
 List of awards honoring women

References

External links 
 100 Women at BBC Online
 BBC 100 Women at Wikimedia UK
 BBC 100 Women Online Initiative at WikiProject Women in Red – 21 November to 15 December 2016

2013 in radio
BBC 100 Women
Lists of women
Awards established in 2013
2013 in British television